Oshi (Kanji: 押) is a strategy board game published by WizKids and designed by Tyler Bielman. Oshi is played on a 9×9 board and each player controls a set of 8 pieces (colored oxblood or ivory).

Story of the game
According to the instructions sheet, the game of Oshi was given to the first Emperor of Japan by goddess Amaterasu. Oshi would then teach the emperor and his court that influence was power but should be used cautiously.

Objective
A player wins by pushing 7 points worth of his or her opponent's pieces off the board.

Reviews
Pyramid

References

Abstract strategy games
Board games introduced in 2006
WizKids games